Astyanax is a genus of freshwater fish in the family Characidae of the order Characiformes. Some of these fish, like many of their relatives, are kept as aquarium pets and known collectively as tetras. With around 150 described species and new ones being described yearly, this genus is among the largest of the entire order; Hyphessobrycon also has more than 145 species and which one is larger at any one time depends on whether more species have been recently described in one or the other. The blind and colorless cave tetra of Mexico is a famous member of the genus, but its taxonomic position is disputed: Some recognize it as part of the Mexican tetra (A. mexicanus) and this is supported by phylogenetic evidence, but others recognize the cave form as a separate species, A. jordani.

The type species is A. argentatus, now regarded as a form of the Mexican tetra (A. mexicanus). The generic name comes from Astyanax, a character in Greek mythology, who was the son of Hector of Troy; in homage to this, several specific epithets also refer to the Iliad.

Taxonomy and systematics
This genus is more or less defined as in 1917 by Carl H. Eigenmann. The lack of comprehensive phylogenetic analyses dealing with this genus is hindering a thorough review and the relationships remain as indeterminate as the monophyly is doubtful. The results of 2020 study using a combination of molecular and morphological data appeared to confirm that Astyanax is not monophyletic and suggested the creation of two new genera and the resurrection of Psalidodon.
Although included in Astyanax by FishBase, phylogenetic evidence supports moving A. aurocaudatus back to the monotypic genus Carlastyanax.

Species
There are currently 124 recognized species in this genus:

References

 
Tetras
Taxa named by Spencer Fullerton Baird
Taxa named by Charles Frédéric Girard